The 2015 Oyo State gubernatorial election occurred in Nigeria on April 11, 2015. APC candidate Abiola Ajimobi won the re-election after defeating Rasheed Ladoja of Accord.

Abiola Ajimobi emerged APC gubernatorial candidate after scoring 4,662 votes and defeating 3 other candidates: Ayobami Adesina, son of former governor of the state, Alhaji Lam Adesina, Adebayo Shittu who is a former Commissioner for Justice and Attorney General in the state. Rasheed Ladoja was the Accord candidate.

Electoral system
The Governor of Oyo State is elected using the plurality voting system.

Primary election

APC primary
The APC primary election was held on December 4, 2014. Abiola Ajimobi won the primary election polling 4,662 votes against 3 other candidates.

Accord primary
Rasheed Ladoja won the primary election polling 1,692 votes as the sole candidate.

Results
Party candidates registered with the Independent National Electoral Commission to contest in the election.

References 

Oyo State gubernatorial election
Oyo State gubernatorial elections
April 2015 events in Nigeria